Hilary Atwood Knight (born July 12, 1989) is an American ice hockey forward with the PWHPA and the United States women's national ice hockey team. She previously played for the Les Canadiennes de Montreal of the CWHL and the Boston Pride of the NWHL, with whom she won the inaugural Isobel Cup.

Knight competed for the Wisconsin Badgers women's ice hockey program, as well as for Choate Rosemary Hall. In her first year at the University of Wisconsin–Madison, Knight helped the team place second in the NCAA championships. The following year she led her team in points as the Badgers went on to win the National Championship. With the US national team, she won eight gold medals at the IIHF World Women's Championships and the gold medal at the 2018 Winter Olympics.

Early life
Knight was born in Palo Alto, California but grew up in Lake Forest, Illinois, and Hanover, New Hampshire. After moving to Illinois her mother enrolled Knight and her three younger brothers in hockey. She grew up in a skiing family. Her cousin is three-time Olympic alpine skier Chip Knight.

Playing career

Wisconsin Badgers
In her freshman season (2007–2008), Knight ranked second on the team in goals (20) and tied for fifth on the team in assists (18). Her points total of 38 was third overall in team scoring. She ranked seventh in the nation in points per game for rookies and game-winning goals. During the season, Knight had 12 multi-point games (ranked third). For the season, Knight led the team in game-winning goals with six. On February 2, Knight recorded a hat trick against WCHA rival North Dakota.

As a sophomore, Knight appeared in 39 games for the Badgers. Knight led the NCAA in goal scoring (45) and points (83). Her 16 power-play goals ranked first in the NCAA. Based on her statistical accomplishments, Knight became the new Badgers record-holder for points, goals, and power-play goals in one season. She recorded 24 multi-point games, 13 multi-goal games, and 11 multi-assist games.

On September 27, 2008, versus the Quinnipiac Bobcats, Knight had a career-high (and school record) five goals in one game. In the process, she recorded her first natural hat trick. Versus WCHA rival North Dakota (on November 16), Knight got her second hat trick of the season. During the Frozen Four, Knight led the team in scoring with six points (three goals and three assists). From September 26 to October 31, Knight had a nine-game point-scoring streak. She would end the season with a six-game point streak.

On October 2, 2010, Knight had a five-point game in a 6–0 victory over RPI. She had a natural hat trick to start the game and then had two assists. On January 14 and 16, 2011, Knight produced eight scoring points while leading the Badgers to a two-game sweep of St. Cloud State. Knight accumulated five points on three goals and two assists in the January 14, 10–0 win. On the 16th, she had two more goals and one assist for three points as the Badgers won 6–0. Of her five goals, two were scored on the power play, and one of the goals on January 14 was the game-winner. With the sweep, the Badgers increased their winning streak to 10 straight games. Knight was the top goal scorer in Div. 1 women's hockey this season with 31. On February 5, 2011, Knight scored her 36th goal of the year at 2:46 in the overtime period as Wisconsin defeated the Bemidji State Beavers by a 3–2 mark at the Sanford Center. Bemidji State goalie Alana McElhinney made 43 saves on the night, including 24 in the second period.

On September 25, 2011, Knight scored her fifth career hat trick in a 13–0 defeat of the Lindenwood Lady Lions ice hockey program. In a December 10, 2011, WCHA contest versus Bemidji State, Knight produced four points, giving her a career total of 239. She has now surpassed Meghan Duggan's 238 career points to become the Wisconsin Badgers' all-time leading point scorer. For her efforts, Knight was recognized as the WCHA Player of the Week. On January 28, 2012, the Badgers hosted a record crowd of 12,402 that attended the Kohl Center as Wisconsin swept the Bemidji State Beavers.  Knight notched her first goal since December 10 with 7:38 left in the third period. Said goal would stand as the game-winner on Fill the Bowl night. She graduated with 262 career points and is the Badgers all-time leader in goals (143), game-winning goals (30), power-play goals (37), and short-handed goals (8).

CWHL
Selected fourth overall by the Boston Blades in the 2012 CWHL Draft, Knight ended the season third overall in league scoring. She became the first American-born player to win the CWHL's Most Valuable Player Award. She was the leading scorer in the postseason, helping the Blades win the 2013 Clarkson Cup.

NWHL
On September 25, 2015, Knight moved to the Boston Pride of the NWHL. In her first game with the Boston Pride, she scored the team's first goal and went on to score another goal in the game. She finished the season as the NWHL's first scoring champion. Knight scored the overtime-winning goal in Game 1 of the 2016 Isobel Cup finals and ultimately won the inaugural Isobel Cup with the Pride. In February 2017, while playing for Team Kessel, Knight scored a goal at the 2nd NWHL All-Star Game.

Return to CWHL
On March 8, 2018, Les Canadiennes de Montreal announced that Knight would be joining the team in time for the 2018 CWHL playoff run. Knight would return to Les Canadiennes for the 2018-19 CWHL season, helping the club reach the 2019 Clarkson Cup finals. Knight would earn an assist in the game, despite the Calgary Inferno defeating Montreal in a 5–2 final score.

PWHPA 
In May 2019, Knight joined the #ForTheGame movement, leading to the formation of the PWHPA.

International

As a teenager, Knight was a United States senior national team member. In November 2006, she played for Team USA in the Four Nations Cup and was the youngest player for Team USA at 17 years old. At the 2007 IIHF World Women's Championship, she was the youngest player on the United States squad. Her head coach was also the Wisconsin head coach Mark Johnson. Knight earned silver at the tournament for the US. Later that year, she played for the United States Under 22 National Team. She scored the game-winning goal at 7:48 of overtime as the U.S. Women's National Team won its third consecutive world title with a 3–2 overtime victory against Canada at the 2011 IIHF Women's World Championship at Hallenstadion. In the United States first game of the 2011 IIHF Eight Nations Tournament, Knight scored a hat trick in a victory over Russia. In the opening match of the 2012 IIHF World Women's Championships, Knight scored two goals in a 9–2 win over Canada.

Olympics
Knight has participated in the 2010 Winter Olympics in Vancouver, the 2014 Winter Olympics in Sochi, the 2018 Winter Olympics in Pyeongchang, and the 2022 Winter Olympics in Beijing.

Knight took a year (2009–2010) off from school at the University of Wisconsin to join Team USA. She was the youngest member of either the men's or women's teams, at 20 years, 217 days of age. She had 7 assists and 1 goal, with the lone goal coming against Finland. She finished the Olympics with 8 points and earned a silver medal.

In 2014, Knight was tied for the Team USA lead in points with 6 and scored the team's first goal of the tournament. She was named to the Media All-Star team after the end of the Games. She finished the tournament with 3 goals and 3 assists for 6 points and earned a silver medal.

In 2018, Knight scored Team USA's first goal in the final game and earned a gold medal.

On January 2, 2022, Knight was named to Team USA's roster to represent the United States at the 2022 Winter Olympics.

Personal life 
Knight identifies as a member of the queer community.

Career statistics

Regular season and playoffs

International

Career highs
 Most goals in one game: 5; vs. Quinnipiac (September 27, 2008)
 Most assists in one game: 5; vs. St. Cloud State (February 11, 2012)
 Most points in one game: 6; vs. St. Cloud State (February 11, 2012)
 Longest point-scoring streak: 20 consecutive games; (December 10, 2010, to February 26, 2011)
 Career multi-point games: 63

Awards and honors
 The city of Sun Valley, Idaho, declared May 19, 2011, as Hilary Knight Day.

NCAA
 2009 RBK Hockey/AHCA Division I first-team All-American
 2009 Patty Kazmaier Memorial Award top 10 finalist
 2009 WCHA Player of the Year
 2009 Frozen Four All-Tournament team
 2011 Frozen Four All-Tournament team
 2011 NCAA Tournament MVP
 2008 WCHA All-Rookie Team
 WCHA Offensive Player of the Week (Week of Oct.8, 2008)
 WCHA Offensive Player of the Week (Week of November 19, 2008)
 WCHA Offensive Player of the Week (Week of October 5, 2010)
 2008–09 WCHA Preseason Rookie of the Year
 WCHA Rookie of the Week honors (Week of January 7, 2009)
 WCHA Rookie of the Week honors (Week of February 4, 2009)
 2010 WCHA Pre-Season Player of the Year
 WCHA Offensive Player of the Week (Week of January 5, 2011)
 WCHA Offensive Player of the Week (Week of January 19, 2011)
 2011 Patty Kazmaier Award Nominee
 2011 First Team All-America selection
 WCHA Player of the Week (Week of December 14, 2011)

CWHL
2013 CWHL Most Outstanding Player Award

NWHL
2015–16 NWHL regular season scoring champion

USA Hockey
 Media All-Star team, 2011 IIHF Women's World Championship
 U.S. Olympic Committee's Athlete of the Month for April 2011
 U.S. Player of the Game, November 9, 2011, vs. Sweden, 2011 4 Nations Cup
 2012 Jeff Sauer Award
 2015 IIHF World Women's Championship Tournament MVP

References

External links

Hilary Knight at Wisconsin Badgers

Hilary Knight at USA Hockey

1989 births
Living people
American expatriate ice hockey players in Canada
American women's ice hockey forwards
Boston Blades players
Boston Pride players
Choate Rosemary Hall alumni
Clarkson Cup champions
Ice hockey players from California
Ice hockey players at the 2010 Winter Olympics
Ice hockey players at the 2014 Winter Olympics
Ice hockey players at the 2018 Winter Olympics
Ice hockey players at the 2022 Winter Olympics
Isobel Cup champions
Les Canadiennes de Montreal players
Medalists at the 2010 Winter Olympics
Medalists at the 2014 Winter Olympics
Medalists at the 2018 Winter Olympics
Medalists at the 2022 Winter Olympics
Olympic gold medalists for the United States in ice hockey
Olympic silver medalists for the United States in ice hockey
Sportspeople from Palo Alto, California
Wisconsin Badgers women's ice hockey players
Professional Women's Hockey Players Association players